Intermountain Medical Center is the flagship hospital of Intermountain Healthcare. Located in Murray, Utah on a  site at the center of the Salt Lake Valley, Intermountain Medical Center serves as a major adult referral center for six surrounding states and more than 75 regional health care institutions. The hospital is also a Level I trauma center, accredited by the American College of Surgeons. It has 504 
beds and is accredited by the Commission on Accreditation of Rehabilitation Facilities. Intermountain Medical Center opened in October 2007, and several premature babies were transferred by Intermountain Healthcare's Life Flight to the hospital on the first day for better treatment and care.

The hospital, the nearby parking lots, and the nearby UTA rail station were built on the site of the former Asarco Murray lead smelter, which was reclaimed as part of an EPA Superfund program.

Intermountain Medical Center and University of Utah Hospital were tied for #1 atop rankings nearly 60 hospitals statewide, according to U.S. News & World Report's 2015-2016 "Best Hospitals" rankings.

References

Hospital buildings completed in 2007
Intermountain Health
Anshen and Allen buildings
Hospitals in Salt Lake County, Utah
Hospitals established in 2007
2007 establishments in Utah
Buildings and structures in Murray, Utah
Trauma centers